Parliamentary elections were held in Bulgaria on 19 April 1997. The result was a victory for the United Democratic Forces (an alliance of the Union of Democratic Forces (SDS), the Democratic Party, the Bulgarian Agrarian National Union-Nikola Petkov and the Bulgarian Social Democratic Party), which won 137 of the 240 seats. Following the election, SDS leader Ivan Kostov became Prime Minister.

Results

Aftermath
Following the elections, Ivan Kostov formed the Kostov Government.

References

Bulgaria
Parliamentary
Parliamentary elections in Bulgaria